Airwaves is a brand of sugarfree chewing gum produced by the Wm. Wrigley Jr. Company, and sold primarily in Europe and East Asia. The brand is marketed for its intense flavor similar to the effect one would get from the consumption of cough drops (which are also sold by Wrigley's). This intensity of flavor is obtained by including Eucalyptus and Menthol in the candy coating of the tablets of gum. 

This menthol and eucalyptus combination is widely used in medicated sweets to clear the head and nasal passages and to reduce the symptoms of nasal congestions and colds.

Airwaves comes in six flavors: Eucalyptus and Menthol (the blue packets), Blackcurrant and Vitamin C (the purple packets), Cherry (the red packets), Grapefruit and Menthol (the pink packets), Herbal (the light green packets) and the newly added Black Mint (Black Packet). The honey and lemon flavor has been discontinued (but is still sold in many Asian countries) along with the spicy cocktail flavor. One time, Airwaves Active was produced, containing guaraná.

Airwaves has often been seen to rapidly relieve cold symptoms (By clearing the nasal and throat passages) for short periods of time. Most people consume two pieces of gum every 30 to 60 minutes in order to maintain the relief. However excessive consumption can lead to a laxative effect.

In popular culture
The chewing gum was featured in Tom Clancy's Splinter Cell: Chaos Theory several times, with Sam Fisher, the game's protagonist, eating from a clearly displayed pack in the first mission cutscene, and clearly visible next to a radio in another cutscene, suggesting that Fisher may be a fan of the gum. A blimp marketing the gum was also seen in a third cutscene in the game featuring the gum's logo.

Wrigley's Airwaves announced in March 2009 that it is to sponsor leading British Touring Car Championship team Motorbase Performance, running under the name Airwaves BMW. They are also the title sponsors of the Airwaves Plymouth Raiders, a professional basketball team, located in the company's base city of Plymouth, who compete in the British Basketball League. Late in 2008, Airwaves became the official chewing gum of the FIA World Rally Championship.

Notes

Wrigley Company brands
Chewing gum